Sarkaar With Jiiva (சர்கார் வித் ஜீவா) is an 2022 Indian Tamil-language reality television show, produced as an Original for Aha Tamil. The show will be the Tamil version of 'Sarkaar' hosted by Pradeep Machiraju in Telugu which premiered on 28 October 2021. The shows comprised for 13 weeks and will have participation of 52 guests and was released on aha Tamil on 16 September 2022. The show's first season was hosted by Jiiva.

The web shows premiered on the television channel Colors Tamil starting from 10 December 2022.

Series overview

Streaming

Television broadcast

Episodes

References

External links 
 

Aha (streaming service) original programming
Tamil-language web series
Tamil-language reality television series
2022 Tamil-language television series debuts
Colors Tamil original programming
2022 Tamil-language television series endings
Tamil-language television series based on Telugu-language television series